Justo Rufino Barrios Auyón (19 July 1835 – 2 April 1885) was a Guatemalan politician and military general who served as President of Guatemala from 1873 to his death in 1885. He was known for his liberal reforms and his attempts to reunite Central America.

Early life 

Barrios was known from his youth for his intellect and energy, went to Guatemala City is a populated place with people to study law, and became a lawyer in 1862,

Rise to power 

In 1867, revolt broke out in western Guatemala, which many residents wished to return to its former status of an independent state as Los Altos. Barrios joined with the rebels in Quetzaltenango, and soon proved himself a capable military leader, and in time gained the rank of general in the rebel army.

In July 1871, Barrios, together with other generals and dissidents, issued the "Plan for the Fatherland" proposing to overthrow Guatemala's long entrenched Conservadora (conservative) administration; soon after, they succeeded in doing so, and General García Granados was declared president and Barrios commander of the armed forces.  While Barrios was back in Quetzaltenago, García Granados was seen as weak by his own party members and was asked to call for elections, as the general consent was that Barrios would make a better president. Barrios was elected president in 1873.

Government 

The Conservative government in Honduras gave military backing to a group of Guatemalan Conservatives wishing to take back the government, so Barrios declared war on the Honduran government. At the same time, Barrios, together with President Luis Bogran of Honduras, declared an intention to reunify the old United Provinces of Central America.

During his time in office, Barrios continued with the liberal reforms initiated by Miguel García Granados, but he was more aggressive in implementing them. A summary of his reforms is:

 Definitive separation between church and state: he expelled the regular clergy such as Morazán had done in 1829 and confiscated their properties.

 Forbid mandatory tithing to weaken secular clergy members and the archbishop.
 Established civil marriage as the only official one in the country
 Secular cemeteries
 Civil records superseded religious ones
 Established secular education across the country
 Established free and mandatory elementary schools
 Closed the Pontifical University of San Carlos and in its place created the secular National University.

Barrios had a National Congress totally pledged to his will, and therefore was able to enact a new constitution in 1879, which allowed him to be reelected as president for another six-year term.

He also was intolerant with his political opponents, forcing many to flee the country and building the infamous Guatemalan Central penitentiary where he had numerous people incarcerated and tortured.

Guatemalan administrative structure during Barrios’ tenure 

Appleton's guide for México and Guatemala from 1884, shows the twenty departments in which Guatemala was divided during Barrios' time in office:

Barrios oversaw substantial cleaning and reconstruction of Guatemala City, and set up a new accountable police force. He brought the first telegraph lines and railroads to the republic. He established a system of public schools in the country.

Economy 

During Barrios' tenure, the "Indian land" that the conservative regime of Rafael Carrera had so strongly defended was confiscated and distributed among those officers who had helped him during the Liberal Revolution in 1871. Decree # 170 (a.k.a. Census redemption decree) made it easy to confiscate those lands in favor of the army officers and the German settlers in Verapaz, as it allowed to publicly sell those common Indian lots. Therefore, the fundamental characteristic of the productive system during Barrios' regime was the accumulation of large swaths of land among few owners and a sort of "farmland servitude," based on the exploitation of the native day laborers.

In order to ensure a steady supply of day laborers for the coffee plantations, which required many, Barrios' government decreed the Day Laborer regulations, labor legislation that placed the entire native population at the disposition of the new and traditional Guatemalan landlords, except the regular clergy, who were eventually expelled form the country and saw their properties confiscated. This decree set the following for the native Guatemalans:

  forced by law to work on farms when the owners of the farms required them, without regard for where the native towns were located.
  under control of local authorities, who were charged with ensuring that day laborers were sent to all the farms that required them.
 subject to "habilitation:" a type of forced advanced pay, which buried the day laborer in debt and then made it legal for the landlords to keep them on their land for as long as they wanted.
 Created the day laborer booklet: a document that proved that a day laborer had no debts to his employer. Without this document, any day laborer was at the mercy of the local authorities and the landlords.

Second term 

In 1879, a constitution was ratified for Guatemala. This was the Republic's first as an independent nation, as the old Conservador regime had ruled by decree. In 1880, Barrios was reelected President for a six-year term.  Barrios unsuccessfully attempted to get the United States of America to mediate the disputed boundary between Guatemala and Mexico.

Central American Union 

Guatemala, El Salvador, and Honduras agreed to re-form the Central American Union, but the then Salvadoran President Rafael Zaldivar decided to withdraw, and sent envoys to Mexico to join in an alliance to overthrow Barrios. Mexican President Porfirio Díaz feared Barrios' liberal reforms and the potential of a strong Central America as a neighbor if Barrios' plans bore fruit. Díaz sent Mexican troops to seize the disputed land of Soconusco.

Death 

Justo Rufino Barrios died during the Battle of Chalchuapa in El Salvador, as did his son, General Venancio Barrios, on 2 April 1885. The official liberal version is that Barrios was killed in action, alongside officer Adolfo V. Hall. However, some versions insist that a Guatemalan soldier missed a shot and killed president Barrios from behind or that there might have been a murder plot.

Upon learning about his death, the Guatemalan Army panicked; officer José María Reyna Barrios, president Barrios' nephew, picked up the lifeless body of Venancio Barrios and organized the withdrawal of the Guatemalan battalions, while preparing the defense against a possible Salvadorian attack. Reyna Barrios, signing as Rosario Yerjabens, told the story of what he saw, which does not match the official account: "The general in Chief, Justo Rufino Barrios, decided, about 8 a.m., to personally command the attack on the northeast side of "Casa Blanca"; and in order to accomplish that, he sent the Jirón Brigade, whose soldiers were all Jalapas. These soldiers behaved in the most cowardly and disgraceful way. It is believed that they had been indoctrinated by some miserable traitor, one of those men without heart or conscience, one of those ungrateful people that was licking their benefactor's hand and abusing both his good heart and fortune. Unfortunately, a moment after the attack began, an enemy bullet wounded him mortally and he had to be taken off the battlefield. This sad occurrence was enough for some coward Jalapa soldiers who saw general Barrios dead, to leave their post and spread the sad news."

On 4 April the defeated Guatemalan forces arrived in Guatemala City, where Reyna Barrios was promoted to general for his valiant battle services.

Today, his portrait is on the five quetzal bill in Guatemala, and the city and port of Puerto Barrios, capital of Izabal, bears his name.

See also
 
 
Avenida Reforma
History of Central America
History of Guatemala
Presidents of Guatemala
Torre del Reformador

Notes

References

Citations

Bibliography

External links
 
 [Short biography and picture https://archive.today/20130121135118/http://www.deguate.com/personajes/article_761.shtml]

1835 births
1885 deaths
People from San Marcos Department
Guatemalan people of Spanish descent
Liberal Party (Guatemala) politicians
Presidents of Guatemala
Positivists
19th-century Guatemalan people
Universidad de San Carlos de Guatemala alumni